Okrzeszyn may refer to the following places in Poland:
Okrzeszyn, Lower Silesian Voivodeship (south-west Poland)
Okrzeszyn, Masovian Voivodeship (east-central Poland)